The following is a timeline of the history of Zanzibar City, Unguja island, Zanzibar, Tanzania. The city is composed of Ng'ambo and Stone Town. Until recently it was known as Zanzibar Town.

Prior to 19th century

 1700 – Old Fort of Zanzibar is built by Omanis (approximate date).
 1710 – Fatima in power.
 1746 – "Arab garrison" installed in fort.
 1753 – Fort "unsuccessfully attacked by Mazrui Arabs from Mombasa."
 1784 – Zanzibar becomes part of Oman.

19th century
 1830 – Mtoni Palace built near town.
 1832 – Capital of the Sultanate of Muscat and Oman relocated to Zanzibar from Muscat, Oman by Said bin Sultan.
 1836 – United States consulate established.
 1841 – British consulate established.
 1844 – French consulate established.
 1850 - Kidichi Baths built near town.
 1856 – Majid bin Said of Zanzibar in power.
 1870
 Barghash ibn Said in power.
 Population: 70,000 (approximate).
 1872 - Cyclone.
 1873 – British "forced the closure of the slave market."
 1879 – Anglican Christ Church built.
 1880 – Marhubi Palace built near town.
 1883 – House of Wonders built.
 1888 – Hamamni Persian Baths built.
 1890 – British in power per Heligoland–Zanzibar Treaty.
 1896 – 27 August: Anglo-Zanzibar War.
 1897 – Slavery abolished in Zanzibar.
 1898 – Catholic St. Joseph's Cathedral built.

20th century

 1904 – Darajani Market building constructed.
 1905
 Bububu railway constructed.
 Plague.
 1910
 Law courts built.
 Population: 35,262.
 1914 – 20 September: German SMS Königsberg sinks British HMS Pegasus in harbour.
 1925 – Peace Memorial Museum established.
 1928 - Rent strike in Ng'ambo.
 1935 - Jubilee Gardens laid out.
 1948
 General strike.
 Population: 45,284.
 1957 – Afro-Shirazi Party headquartered in town.
 1961 – June: Unrest.
 1964
 12 January: Zanzibar Revolution; city becomes capital of People's Republic of Zanzibar and Pemba.
 April: Sultanate of Zanzibar becomes part of the new United Republic of Tanzania.
 City becomes capital of semiautonomous region of Zanzibar.
 Mtoro Rehani becomes mayor.
 1966 - Kikwajuni GDR housing built.
 1972 - 7 April: Abeid Karume assassinated.
 1973 - Television Zanzibar inaugurated.
 1977 - Trains of Michenzani (housing) built (approximate date).
 1985
 Economic liberalization begins.
 Population: 133,000 (estimate).
 1994
 Palace Museum established.
 Stone Town Conservation Plan approved.
 Old Dispensary building restored.
 1997
 Zanzibar International Film Festival founded.
 Keele Square rehabilitated.
 1999
 Area of city: 1,600 hectares.
 Population: 195,000 (estimate).
 2000 – Stone Town designated a UNESCO World Heritage Site.

21st century

 2004 – Sauti za Busara (music festival) begins.
 2005 – Population: 220,000 (estimate).
 2008 – 21 May – 19 June: 2008 Zanzibar power blackout.
2009–2010 – 10 December–March: Second Zanzibar power blackout
 2009 – Forodhani Gardens rehabilitated.
 2012 – Anti-government protests.
 2013 – August: Two 18-year-old, British volunteer teachers, Katie Gee and Kirstie Trup, were injured by an acid attack by men on a motorcycle near Stone Town.
 2014 – June: Mosque bombed.

See also
 History of Stone Town
 History of Ng'ambo
 Wards of Zanzibar City
 History of Zanzibar (islands)
 List of Sultans of Zanzibar
 Zanzibar Urban/West Region (Zanzibar City is capital)
 List of football clubs in Zanzibar
 Timelines of other cities in Tanzania: Dar es Salaam

References

Bibliography

Published in 19th century

 
 
 
 
 

Published in 20th century
 
 
 
 
 
 
 
 
 
 
 
 
 
 
 

Published in 21st century

External links

 

Years in Zanzibar

Zanzibar city
History of Zanzibar
Zanzibar